Tony or Anthony Mann may refer to:

Tony Mann (cricketer) (1945 – 2019), Australian cricketer
Tony Mann (physicist), physicist from Western Australia (see TV-FM DX)
Anthony Mann (1906–1967), American actor and film director
Sir Anthony Mann (judge) (born 1951), English High Court Judge